Gallatin County High School, also known as Gallatin High School, is a public high school located in Warsaw, Kentucky, United States. It is the only high school in the Gallatin County School District. Jon Jones is the school principal. The school's athletic teams are called the Wildcats.

References

External links
 Gallatin High School
 Gallatin County Schools

Public high schools in Kentucky
Buildings and structures in Gallatin County, Kentucky